Singamuthu (born 8 December 1958) is an Indian actor who has appeared in Tamil language films as a comedian.

Career
Singamuthu has primarily appeared in comedy roles in films as a supporting actor debuting in Neram Nalla Irukku (1987). He started developing his career in the acting sector by doing small comedy roles in cinemas. He often shared screen space with popular comedian Vadivelu, and the duo has given many hilarious comedy scenes to Tamil movies.

Controversy
In 2010, Vadivelu held a press conference, accusing Singamuthu for forgery and financial cheating. Vadivelu, who was previously friends with Singamuthu, purchased land from him, but later came to learn that the documents were void. This resulted in the former taking legal action on the latter. Later in May 2010, Singamuthu was arrested after assaulting Vadivelu's assistant Shankar, but was later released after three days in jail. It was eventually proved that the pair were actually cheated by the salesman, who had sold the land to Singamuthu illegally.

Selected filmography

Television

Award
2014: Tamil Nadu State Film Award for Best Comedian - Many films

References

External links 
 

Living people
Male actors in Tamil cinema
21st-century Indian male actors
Tamil comedians
1958 births